The Royal Indian Open is a tournament organized for female professional tennis players, played on outdoor hard courts. The event is classified as a WTA Challenger Series tournament. It made its debut in 2012, in Pune, India. It is played at the Shree Shiv Chhatrapati Sports Complex.

In 2012, a tournament, classified as a WTA Challenger Series tournament, made its debut in Pune, India. The Challenger tournament has since been relocated to Mumbai.

History
Pune is the fourth town in the history of India to host a WTA event, after Kolkata (2005–2007), Hyderabad (2003–2005) and Bangalore (2006–2008).

India's renewed participation through this Challenger event was originally supposed to be held in Delhi, but on 17 October 2012, just a few weeks before the tournament's first edition, it was announced the event had been shifted to Pune.

In 2012, it became the second event (after the OEC Taipei Ladies Open) to be part of the WTA 125s.

In 2012, the tournament was featured as a WTA Challenger event, and named the Royal Indian Open. Pune is the fourth city in the history of India to host a WTA event, after Bangalore, Hyderabad, and Kolkata (Sunfeast Open). Later, Mumbai became the fifth city to do the same.

India's renewed participation through this Challenger event was originally supposed to be held in Delhi, but on 17 October 2012, just a few weeks before the tournament's first edition, it was announced the event had been shifted to Pune, to be held at the Shree Shiv Chhatrapati Sports Complex.

In 2012, it became the second event (after the OEC Taipei Ladies Open) to be part of the WTA 125s.

Past finals

Singles

Doubles

See also
 WTA Indian Open
 Mumbai Open

References

External links
 Official website

WTA 125 tournaments
Tennis tournaments in India
Sport in Pune
 
Hard court tennis tournaments
2012 establishments in India
2013 disestablishments in India
ITF Women's World Tennis Tour
2001 establishments in India